A lockdown is an emergency protocol that usually prevents people or information from leaving an area. 

Lockdown or Lock Down may also refer to:

Film and television
 Lockdown (1990 film)
 Lockdown (2000 film)
 Lockdown (2021 English film)
 Lockdown (2021 Nigerian film)
 12 Rounds 3: Lockdown, a 2015 film
 Lockdown (2006 TV series), a National Geographic Channel show on prisons
 Lockdown (2020 TV series), a Canadian-American children's and teen streaming television series
 Lockdown (Bengali film), 2021 film

TV episodes
 "Lockdown" (The 4400)
 "Lockdown" (The Flash)
 "Lockdown" (Brooklyn Nine-Nine)
 "Lockdown" (Haven)
 "Lockdown" (House)
 "Lockdown" (Lost)
 "Lockdown" (Stargate SG-1)

Music
Lock Down, a 2002 album by Krosfyah
 "Lock Down", a 2016 song by Stooshe
"Lockdown", a 2007 song by Alabama 3
"Lock Down", a song by Cypress Hill from the 1993 album Black Sunday
"Lock Down", a song by Guttermouth from the 1996 album Teri Yakimoto
"Lock Down", a song by Jayo Felony from the 1995 album Take a Ride
"Lock Down", a song by the Inner City Posse from the 1990 EP Bass-ment Cuts
"Lockdown", a song by Amy Lee from the 2014 soundtrack Aftermath

Other uses
 Lockdown (novel), a 2020 novel by Peter May
 "Lockdown" (poem), 2020 poem by Simon Armitage
 Lock-on (protest tactic) or lockdown
 Lockdown (Transformers), a fictional character
 Stay-at-home order or lockdown, a mass quarantine order
 TNA Lockdown, a TV wrestling event
 Tom Clancy's Rainbow Six: Lockdown, a 2005 video game